The Uganda women's national rugby sevens team represents Uganda in international rugby sevens. They have previously participated in the 2009 Rugby World Cup Sevens for the inaugural women's tournament. Their current coach, Helen Buteme, was one of the players in the 2009 squad.

Uganda competed at the 2019 Africa Women's Sevens which also served as an automatic Olympic qualification tournament for the winner. They unfortunately finished in 5th place. The Lady Cranes will attend the 2021 Safari Sevens.

Tournament History

Rugby World Cup Sevens

Women's Africa Cup Sevens

References

Women's national rugby sevens teams
sevens